Hickory Creek is a tributary of Buffalo Creek in western Polk County, Arkansas, in the United States. The stream headwaters arise adjacent to US Route 59 approximately 0.6 miles southwest of Vandervoort and it flows to the northwest for a linear distance of approximately six miles to its confluence with Buffalo Creek one third of a mile from the Arkansas-Oklahoma border.

References

Rivers of Arkansas
Rivers of Polk County, Arkansas